Julia Bentley was the 22nd High Commissioner of Canada to Malaysia from 2017 to 2020.

Bentley earned a BA in East Asian Studies from Princeton University in 1981, a post-graduate diploma in modern Chinese history from Nanjing University in 1983 and a MA in East Asian Studies from the University of Toronto in 1984. She is a 1978 graduate of the Toronto French School.

References

Living people
Canadian women ambassadors
High Commissioners of Canada to Malaysia
Princeton University alumni
University of Toronto alumni
Year of birth missing (living people)